Hell Harbor is a 1930 American pre-Code drama film directed by Henry King and written by Fred de Gresac, Clarke Silvernail and Brewster Morse. The film stars Lupe Vélez, Jean Hersholt, John Holland, Gibson Gowland, Harry Allen and Al St. John. The film was released on March 15, 1930, by United Artists.

Plot
Anita Morgan, a descendant of the famous pirate Henry Morgan, is living a carefree and careless life on an island in the Caribbean, but would much rather be living the same life In Havana. When she learns that her father, in exchange for money, has promised her hand in marriage to one of his swarthy friends, she is more convinced that Havana is the place to be. When an American comes to the island to buy some pearls, she falls in love with him. and when she discovers he is to be tricked out of his money and killed, she makes plans to save him...and go to Havana with him.

Cast
 Lupe Vélez as Anita Morgan
 Jean Hersholt as Joseph Horngold
 John Holland as Bob Wade
 Gibson Gowland as Henry Morgan
 Harry Allen as Peg Leg
 Al St. John as Bunion
 Paul E. Burns as Blinky 
 George Bookasta as Spotty

References

External links

 
 
 
 
 Southseascinema, a website devoted to island theme films

1930 films
American black-and-white films
1930s English-language films
Films directed by Henry King
United Artists films
American drama films
1930 drama films
Films set in the Caribbean
1930s American films